USS Hart (DD-110) was a  built for the United States Navy during World War I.

Namesakes
Ezekiel Bishop Hart was born c. 1795. He entered the Navy as a Midshipman on 30 April 1814. He was killed in the action of Commodore Isaac Chauncey's squadron on Lake Ontario on 26 August 1814.

John E. Hart was appointed a Midshipman on 23 February 1841. He served on various ships of the fleet, and was appointed Lieutenant Commander in July 1862. Commanding , Hart served in the West Gulf Blockading Squadron during the American Civil War and engaged two Confederate steamers in the Red River near Fort DeRussy on 4 May 1863. He died of fever contracted on duty on the Mississippi River on 11 June 1863.

Description
The Wickes class was an improved and faster version of the preceding . Two different designs were prepared to the same specification that mainly differed in the turbines and boilers used. The ships built to the Bethlehem Steel design, built in the Fore River and Union Iron Works shipyards, mostly used Yarrow boilers that deteriorated badly during service and were mostly scrapped during the 1930s. They had a crew of 6 officers and 108 enlisted men.

Performance differed radically between the ships of the class, often due to poor workmanship. The Wickes class was powered by two steam turbines, each driving one propeller shaft, using steam provided by four water-tube boilers.

The ships were armed with four 4-inch (102 mm) guns in single mounts and were fitted with two 1-pounder guns for anti-aircraft defense. Their primary weapon, though, was their torpedo battery of a dozen 21 inch (533 mm) torpedo tubes in four triple mounts. In many ships a shortage of 1-pounders caused them to be replaced by 3-inch (76 mm) anti-aircraft (AA) guns. They also carried a pair of depth charge rails. A "Y-gun" depth charge thrower was added to many ships.

Construction and career
Hart, named in honor of Ezekiel Hart and John E. Hart, was launched 4 July 1918; by Union Iron Works of San Francisco, California, sponsored by Mrs. Daniel C. Nutting; and commissioned 26 May 1919, Comdr. Harold Jones in command. Hart joined the destroyer force and operated off the California coast until 17 July 1920, when she was reclassified as a light minelayer, DM-8, and proceeded to Mare Island Navy Yard for installation of minelaying equipment. Following her conversion, Hart was assigned to Mine Detachment, Asiatic Fleet, and sailed for the Philippine Islands in November 1920. She subsequently operated in waters off the Philippine Islands and China in peacetime operations.

Ordered to San Diego, California, for deactivation, Hart sailed from Manila, 12 December 1930 and arrived at San Diego 24 January 1931. She decommissioned 1 June 1931, and her name was struck from the Navy List 11 November. Hart was sold for scrap 25 February 1932 in accordance with the London Treaty for the limitation of naval armaments.

Notes

References

External links
 NavSource Photos

Wickes-class destroyers
Ships built in San Francisco
1918 ships
Wickes-class destroyer minelayers